The EMD 567 is a line of large medium-speed diesel engines built by General Motors' Electro-Motive Division. This engine, which succeeded Winton's 201A, was used in EMD's locomotives from 1938 until its replacement in 1966 by the EMD 645. Like the Winton 201A, the EMD 645 and the EMD 710, the EMD 567 is a two-stroke engine.

GE now makes EMD-compatible replacement parts.

History
Eugene W. Kettering, son of Charles F. Kettering, joined  Winton Engine in 1930. He moved to Detroit in 1936, and was a central figure in the development of the 567 and the Detroit Diesel 6-71. He moved to EMD in 1938, became Chief Engineer at EMD in 1948, then Division Director in 1956 and subsequently Research Assistant to the General Manager in 1958 until his retirement in 1960. The 567 was released in 1938.

In 1951, Eugene Kettering presented a paper to the American Society of Mechanical Engineers entitled History and Development of the 567 Series General Motors Locomotive Engine, which goes into great detail about the technical obstacles that were encountered during the development of the 567 engine (these same considerations apply to the 645 and 710). The 567's designers started with a tabula rasa, systematically eliminating each of the 201A's many deficiencies which were preventing the earlier design from becoming successful in freight service, although the 201A was relatively successful in the less-demanding passenger and switching services. The 567 design had nothing in common with the 201A except the two-stroke cycle itself: each and every component of the 201A was replaced with a new design, even the "dipstick", to paraphrase one of Kettering's off-handed comments. The 567 proved to be exceptionally successful in passenger, switching, freight, marine and stationary services, and, counting its two successors, the 645 and 710, which are not materially different from the 567 (all have the same external dimensions, differing mainly in per cylinder displacement), collectively have given nearly 80 years of exceptionally reliable service to those applications. As but one example of the achievements of the tabula rasa design: whereas the Winton 201A was doing very well with a  piston lifetime, the 567 immediately achieved a  piston lifetime, and in at least one case, reached a  piston lifetime, a 10:1 to 20:1 improvement.

Specification 

All 567 engines are two-stroke V-engines with an angle of 45° between cylinder banks. The 201A was 60° between cylinder banks; 45° later proved to be significant when EMD subsequently adapted the road switcher concept for most of its locomotives, and which required the narrower (albeit taller) engine which 45° provides. The 710, 645, and 567 are the only two-stroke engines commonly used today in locomotives.

The engine is a uniflow design with four poppet-type exhaust valves in the cylinder head. For maintenance, a power assembly, consisting of a cylinder head, cylinder liner, piston, piston carrier, and piston rod, can be individually and relatively easily and quickly replaced. The block is made from flat, formed and rolled structural steel members and steel forgings welded into a single structure (a "weldment"). Blocks may, therefore, be easily repaired, if required, using conventional shop tools. Each bank of cylinders has an overhead camshaft which operates the exhaust valves and the unit injectors.

The 567 is laid out with engine accessories (oil and water pumps and governors) at the "forward" end and the power take off at the "rear" end. The blowers and camshafts are at the "rear" end of the engine, with the blowers mounted above the power take off.

All engines have mechanically-controlled unit injectors (patented in 1934 by General Motors, EMD's former owner).

All 567 engines utilize forced induction, with either a Roots blower or a turbocharger. The turbocharger (a combination turbo-compressor system) follows EMD's innovative design that uses a gear train and over-running clutch to drive the compressor rotor during low engine speed, when exhaust gas temperature (and, correspondingly, heat energy) alone is insufficient to drive the turbine. At higher engine speeds, increased exhaust gas temperature is sufficient to drive the turbine and the clutch disengages, turning the turbo-compressor system into a true turbocharger. The turbo-compressor can revert to compressor mode momentarily during demands for large increases in engine output power. While more expensive to maintain than Roots blowers, the turbocharger significantly reduces fuel consumption and emissions, while improving high-altitude performance. Additionally, EMD's turbo-compressor can provide a 50 percent increase in maximum rated horsepower over Roots-blown engines for the same engine displacement.

Turbocharging effectively eliminates this derating.

Modifications
567AC engines  (an "A" block upgraded to "C" block specifications) and 567BC engines (a "B" block upgraded to "C" block specifications), both of which modifications eliminate the engine's "water deck" and substitute a "water manifold", as well as 567C and 567D engines, may be upgraded to use 645 power assemblies, theoretically achieving an increase in horsepower, but not without corresponding changes to the engine's Woodward governor which activates and controls the engine's "fuel rack".  Although this power increase is not recommended, horsepower-for-horsepower updates (e.g.,  567D to  "645D"—645 power assemblies in a 567 block) are quite successful and common.

As 645 power assemblies are more readily available than 567 power assemblies, this upgrade may also be employed in so-called "life extension" programs, in which case the power assemblies would be upgraded, and the engine may be de-turbo-ed, without corresponding changes to the engine's Woodward governor, hence without a corresponding power increase.

Because of their age, 567 engines are generally exempt from emissions rules. EMD manufactures a special series of 645 power assemblies which are particularly useful in updating these exempt 567 engines and also certain exempt 645 engines.

Versions 
Numerous early improvements were aimed at increasing reliability and life, including a switch from the "U" shaped top (exhaust) well to a "V" shaped top well. This eliminated the cast top deck, which had been the source of some early-life failures, in favor of a top deck fabricated from plate steel. The 567 gave way to the 567A in 1941, which incorporated further top deck improvements and camshaft gear train changes. The 567B followed in 1946 with minor improvements. The 567C was released to further improve reliability and manufacturability. Visually, the 567C may be distinguished from earlier models by the presence of round (instead of square) handholes.

The cost of a 16-567 in 1941 was US$24,000, and a 16-567B in 1951 was US$32,905.

Stationary/marine versions
 
 
Like most EMD engines, the 567 was also sold for stationary and marine applications.
Stationary and marine installations were available with either a left or right-hand rotating engine.

Marine engines differ from railroad and stationary engines mainly in the shape and depth of the engine's oil sump, which was altered to accommodate the rolling and pitching motions encountered in marine applications.

567 locomotive models

An EMD locomotive catalog, contemporary with the 567, lists the following models:

Most 567C locomotive models used D37B traction motors until mid 1959 when the D47B traction motor was used in production locomotives. Very early 567C locomotives from 1953 used the D27B traction motor.

567C and 567D engine maintenance

These two models are by far the most maintainable, with many 645 service parts being rather easily fitted to C and D engines.

The 567D's turbocharger is perhaps the least maintainable part of such an engine, and the 567D turbo has many more maintenance issues than 645E and later turbos. A common choice is conversion of a 567D turbo engine to Roots-blown, thereby abandoning the turbo and its many issues. Installation of 645 power assemblies will still allow Roots-converted 4-axle locomotives (GP20s) to produce , as does a Roots-blown 16-645E, thereby becoming the functional equivalent of a GP38, although with older electrical equipment and controls, and, of course, the older carbody.

Many EMD locomotives with C and D engines are still operating, particularly as their relatively light weight (about ) is of significant benefit to shortline and industrial operators.

See also
EMD 645
EMD 710
EMD 1010

Notes

References

Bibliography

Service Department (1954?). The Complete Line of General Motors Diesel Locomotives. La Grange, IL: Electro-Motive Division of General Motors Corporation

External links

Diesel locomotive engines
Marine diesel engines
Two-stroke diesel engines
V6 engines
V8 engines
V12 engines
V16 engines